The 1957 Paris–Tours was the 51st edition of the Paris–Tours cycle race and was held on 6 October 1957. The race started in Paris and finished in Tours. The race was won by Fred De Bruyne.

General classification

References

1957 in French sport
1957
1957 Challenge Desgrange-Colombo
October 1957 sports events in Europe